Blablanga is an Oceanic language spoken in the Solomon Islands. Its speakers live on Santa Isabel Island.

References

Bibliography

External links 
 ELAR archive of Documentation of Blablanga

Languages of the Solomon Islands
Ysabel languages
Definitely endangered languages